The Utah Championship presented by Zions Bank is a professional golf tournament on the Korn Ferry Tour, played at Oakridge Country Club in Farmington, Utah.

One of the original tournaments of the 1990 Ben Hogan Tour as the Utah Classic, the tournament has been played every year but two (1997, 1998). The first seven (1990–1996) were played in Provo at Riverside Country Club and the next sixteen (1999–2014) at Willow Creek in Sandy.

Formerly played in early September, the tournament moved to late July in 2011 and to mid-July in 2012. It moved to Thanksgiving Point Golf Club in Lehi in 2015, a few miles north of Utah Lake and along the Jordan River.

Two major champions have won this event: John Daly won $20,000 in the inaugural edition in 1990, and Zach Johnson won $81,000 in 2003. The purse in 2018 was $700,000, with a winner's share of $126,000.

Winners

Bolded golfers graduated to the PGA Tour via the Korn Ferry Tour regular-season money list.

Notes

References

External links

Coverage on the Korn Ferry Tour's official site
Thanksgiving Point Golf Club (2015– )
Willow Creek Country Club (1999–2014)
Riverside Country Club (1990–1996)

Korn Ferry Tour events
Golf in Utah
Recurring sporting events established in 1990
1990 establishments in Utah